Rakovica is a Serbo-Croatian place name, meaning "crab". It may refer to:

 Rakovica, Belgrade, an urban neighborhood and a municipality of Belgrade, Serbia
 Rakovica, Bosnia and Herzegovina, a village near Ilidža, Bosnia
 Rakovica, Croatia, near Plitvice, Croatia
 Rakovica, Kranj in Slovenia
 Rakovica, the Hungarian name for Racovița, Sibiu, a commune in Sibiu County, Romania
 Rakovica, the Hungarian name for Racovița, Timiș, a commune in Timiș County, Romania
 Rakovica (Čajetina),  village in the municipality of Čajetina, western Serbia
 Rakovica (Kozarska Dubica),  village in the municipality of Bosanska Dubica, Bosnia and Herzegovina
 Mala Rakovica, settlement in the Samobor territory of Zagreb County, Croatia
 Selo Rakovica, an urban neighborhood of Belgrade in the municipality of Voždovac
 Velika Rakovica, settlement in the Samobor territory of Zagreb County, Croatia

See also
 Rakovitsa (disambiguation)
Rakovec (disambiguation)

Serbo-Croatian place names